Kurdikeri is a village in Dharwad district of Karnataka, India.

Demographics 
As of the 2011 Census of India there were 512 households in Kurdikeri and a total population of 2,452 consisting of 1,236 males and 1,216 females. There were 351 children ages 0-6.

References

Villages in Dharwad district